Warwick Richard Capper (born 12 June 1963) is a former Australian rules footballer who played for the Sydney Swans and the Brisbane Bears in the Victorian Football League/Australian Football League. An accomplished full-forward, Capper kicked 388 goals over a 124-game career, finishing runner-up twice in the Coleman Medal stakes with a peak of 103 goals in 1987. He was also famous for his high-flying spectacular marks, one of which earned him a Mark of the Year award in 1987.

Known for his colourful personality and flashy looks, Capper was used as a marketing tool amid VFL expansion north of the Barassi Line, and for a time he was one of the few Australian rules footballers with a high profile in New South Wales and Queensland. He became the VFL's highest-paid player in the mid-1980s, and his blonde mullet, white or pink boots, and skintight shorts helped make him one of the game's most recognisable figures. Off the field, he was known for his association with flamboyant Swans owner Geoffrey Edelsten, as well as his foray into pop music with the 1985 single "I Only Take What's Mine", the music video of which features Capper's pink sports car and Edelsten's helicopter.

His post-football career has included various high-profile media appearances, including comedy tours; a self-released sex tape; a failed run for Queensland state politics; and work as a stripper, male escort, and Surfers Paradise Meter Maid.

Early career
Capper was raised in the eastern Melbourne suburb of Huntingdale and briefly attended Brighton Grammar School. His father Wally played football in the Ovens and Murray League with Lou Richards and for Fitzroy reserves before a broken leg cut short his playing career, which led him to later being a Melbourne City Council worker. Capper began playing football for the Northvale Junior Football Club in Mulgrave and later Oakleigh District Football Club with future VFL teammate David Rhys-Jones.

He was recruited by VFL club South Melbourne and played in the under-19s for two years: 1980 and 1981. Capper returned to Oakleigh Districts in 1982 to play senior football with bigger bodies and to enhance his chances of playing senior football with the Swans. After an outstanding season with the club and winning the best and fairest in the competition, Capper was given the opportunity to play for the Swans at senior level in 1983 and subsequently moved to Sydney for the club's second year in the city.

VFL/AFL career
Capper was noted for his marking ability rather than his kicking accuracy. With several spectacular high marks in his career, he was nominated for Mark of the Year on several occasions and won in 1987, with a mark that is captured in Jamie Cooper's painting The Game That Made Australia, commissioned by the AFL in 2008 to celebrate the 150th anniversary of the sport.

Although Capper was more famous for his marking, in 1987 he managed 103 goals at an average of 4.48 per game. He finished runner up in the Coleman Medal in both 1986 (to Brian Taylor) and 1987 (to Tony Lockett).

He was also well known for his looks, his long blonde locks of hair, deeply tanned skin, white boots and extremely tight shorts. This formed part of the flamboyant image of the Swans club during the years in which it was owned by Geoffrey Edelsten. Adding to their already extravagant personas, Capper would fly around in Edelsten's pink helicopters. Moreover, he had a bright pair of newcomers called 'Bros' and according to Capper, "had the world at his feet".

When Capper moved to the Brisbane Bears at the end of the 1987 season with a $350,000 three-year contract, he became the highest-paid player in the VFL. Capper did not do well in Queensland and returned to Sydney after having kicked only 71 goals in 34 games.

At the end of his VFL career, he returned to Queensland in 1992 to play semi-professionally with the Southport Sharks.

In 1985, Capper released a single "I Only Take What's Mine", referred to as "wonderfully woeful". In 1986, he made a guest appearance on the Australian soap opera Neighbours and has also starred in a pornographic movie.

Post-football life
Since retiring from football, Capper has juggled media appearances and various jobs, including council roadworker. In 1993, Capper posed in an explicit pictorial with his then-wife, Joanne Capper, for the August issue of Australian Penthouse magazine. He also announced that he was to become a male stripper.

He has had continued participation in football only through the charity AFL Legends Match. In 2002, he had a brief stint as skills coach for former club Southport.

In 2003, Capper guest starred as AFL footballer "Dwayne Carey" (a play on Wayne Carey) in season 3 of the television series Pizza.

Capper makes regular appearances on television as a guest on shows such as The AFL Footy Show. He appeared briefly on the reality television show Celebrity Big Brother, but he was ejected from the series by the show's producer for exposing his penis to fellow housemate Kimberley Cooper during an argument.

In 2005, Capper released an autobiography called Fool Forward in which he openly admitted to using illegal drugs (amphetamines) during his VFL/AFL career.

In 2006, Capper again made the news after an incident with film director Kayran Noskca, leading to a broken nose.

In 2008, Capper again made news headlines when he had cosmetic surgery involving botox and liposuction. He also challenged former professional boxer Jeff Fenech to a fight. In 2009, he did box in a promotional charity match, losing a match against Wendell Sailor, whom Capper had previously criticised.

2009 Queensland state election
Capper intended to contest the 2009 Queensland state election in the electoral district of Beaudesert as an independent. Capper announced he would run after Pauline Hanson announced officially that she was to be a candidate in the seat. Capper's political endeavour collapsed a few days later when he was advised that he had missed the midday deadline on 3 March to register with the Electoral Commission Queensland. When asked if Capper's running in the election was a joke, his campaign manager, Mark Jackson, replied that politics was a joke.

Lads' magazine Zoo Weekly bankrolled his short-lived campaign but denied it was responsible for not lodging his registration, blaming Capper's campaign manager.

2009 to present
In late 2010, Capper became the face of a promotional campaign for Quickbeds.com, a discount accommodation website. He appears in online and off-line promotional material and across the accommodation website promoting the website as 'cheap and easy – just like me'.

In 2011, he made a cameo appearance in the premiere episode of the television program The Joy of Sets, recommencing his short-lived alliance with the former hosts of Get This. Capper continued to make unlikely cameo appearances during re-enactments in subsequent episodes, dressed in nothing but gold hotpants.

Capper was a participant on The Celebrity Apprentice Australia, where he was the first contestant to be fired.

References

Bibliography

External links

 
 
60 minutes interview

Sydney Swans players
Australian rules footballers from Melbourne
Big Brother (Australian TV series) contestants
Brisbane Bears players
Southport Australian Football Club players
Living people
1963 births
People educated at Brighton Grammar School
The Apprentice Australia candidates
Sportspeople from the Gold Coast, Queensland
People from the City of Monash